Grace Gassette (March 28, 1871 — 1955) was an American artist and sculptor, decorated for her contributions to developing orthopedic devices for the treatment of war injuries, during World War I.

Early life
Grace Gassette was born in Chicago, Illinois, the daughter of Norman Theodore Gassette and Martha Graves Gassette. Her father was a businessman and veteran of the American Civil War. After her mother's death, she was raised by her stepmother, Amelia Boggs Gassette. 

As a young woman, Gassette was a founding member of the Woman's Athletic Club in Chicago. She studied with Mary Cassatt and was an art student in Paris, part of the social circle of American expatriates that included Gertrude Stein and Alice Woods Ullman.

Career
Gassette lived with her stepmother and worked as a portrait painter in Paris before World War I. She was in charge of surgical supplies for the American Ambulance Hospital in Neuilly-sur-Seine when the war began. In 1916 Gassette was made technical director of the Franco-American Corrective Surgical Appliance Committee, a committee working on traction systems and other orthopedic supports for war-injured soldiers. She used her fluent knowledge of French and of anatomy to work with surgeons and nurses, to design such devices as the Gassette Suspensory Hammock, a low-cost wooden device meant to preserve more comfort, symmetry and function for the healing body. She published about her work in medical journals.

Gassette was credited with making custom devices that helped hundreds of soldiers avoid or lessen amputation, deformity, and impairment after a limb injury. "I can tell you what I have done and tell you about my men," she wrote from France. "I love them and they are fine, every one of them. I guess that it is because I love them that I find a way to help them." "She has, by careful study, found means to relieve the suffering and to expedite the cure of men who have had arms or legs broken or shattered," explained one report in 1918. Her story was retold often in American periodicals, included one account by editor Alice Stone Blackwell linking her work to women's suffrage: "As this young woman is a citizen of Illinois, when she comes home she will have the right to vote. And it will be strange indeed if any of the many right hands she has restored should ever cast a ballot against equal suffrage."

The French government awarded her the Cross of the Legion of Honour for her services, one of the first two American women so honored, alongside novelist Edith Wharton.

Later life
Gassette lived in Bazainville after the war. She taught classes, and wrote two books in French on health topics, La Clé (1938), and La Santé (1950). She was consulted to treat Franklin D. Roosevelt when he was in declining health in 1944, but she offered only a packet of medicinal salts.

 She died in Woodstock, Vermont in 1955, aged 84 years.

References

External links
 
 Bennet Harvey collection's scrapbook on Chicago artist Grace Gassette's work in World War I Paris, Lake Forest College Library.

1871 births
1955 deaths
American women in World War I
People from Chicago
19th-century American women artists
20th-century American women artists